Japan in Paris in L.A. is a soundtrack album by the experimental rock band Red Krayola, released on October 5, 2004, by Drag City. The short film Japan in Paris in L.A. was directed by Bruce and Norman Yonemoto in 1996.

Track listing

Personnel 
Red Krayola
David Grubbs
Jim O'Rourke
Stephen Prina
Mary Lass Stewart
Mayo Thompson – production
Tom Watson

Additional musicians and production
Alan H. Barker – engineering

References 

1996 soundtrack albums
Drag City (record label) albums
Film soundtracks
Red Krayola albums
albums produced by Mayo Thompson